Levon Ashotovich Grigorian (7 September 1947 – 29 November 1975), was a Soviet Armenian chess player and son of the poet Ashot Grashi.

He won Armenian Chess Championships in 1964, 1966, 1968, 1969, 1971, 1972 and Uzbekistani Chess Championships in 1974 and 1975.

Grigorian was born in Yerevan, Armenia and died in Tashkent, Uzbekistan.
His brother Karen Grigorian was a chess International Master.

References

External links
 

1947 births
1975 deaths
Armenian chess players
Soviet chess players
Sportspeople from Yerevan
20th-century chess players